Chiddes is a commune in the Nièvre department in central France.

Demographics
According to the 1999 census, the population was 373. On 1 January, 2019, the estimate was 339.

See also
Communes of the Nièvre department

References

Communes of Nièvre